Heavy Duty is an album released by popular Soca band Xtatik from Trinidad and Tobago in 1997. The album was considered one of the most successful Soca albums at the time of its release. In a 2004 interview, lead vocalist of the band Machel Montano claimed it was his favourite album of all time.

The song Big Truck on the album won Trinidad's 1997 Annual Road March Competition for Trinidad and Tobago Carnival.

Track listing
"Intro"
"Big Truck"
"Follow Yuh Partner"
"Winerboi"
"Calypso Nice"
"Tayee Tayee"
"J'Ouvert Girls"
"What They Say (They Say)"
"Pretty Gyal"
"No Carnival"
"Crowded"
"Music Farm"
"Outro"

Vocals
Machel Montano - Lead Vocalist
Wayne Rodriguez - Vocalist
Darryl Henry (Farmer Nappy) - Vocalist
Vincent Rivers - Vocalist
Winston Bailey - Vocalist 
Sean Caruth - Vocalist
Samuel Jack - Vocalist
Joseph Rivers - Vocalist
Richard Felix - Vocalist
Nicholas Antoine - Vocalist
Errol Singh - Vocalist

Musicians
Bass - Vincent Rivers, Joseph Rivers
Trumpet - Nicholas Antoine
Tenor Saxophone - Charles Dougherly
Trombone - Kurt Francisco

References

Machel Montano albums
1997 albums